This is a list of the schools and colleges in Krishnagiri district.

 Adhiyamaan College of Engineering, Hosur.
 Government College of Engineering, Bargur

References 

Krishnagiri
Krishnagiri district